Evidently... John Cooper Clarke is a 2012 television documentary about the life of the Salford performance poet John Cooper Clarke. It was directed by John Ross and produced by Scotty Clark and was first aired on BBC Four in May 2012 as part of BBC Four and BBC 6 Music's "Punk Britannia" season. It features testimonies from Bill Bailey, Pete Shelley, Paul Farley, Steve Coogan, Mark Radcliffe, Craig Charles, Plan B, Kate Nash, Alex Turner, Miranda Sawyer and Paul Morley; and poems by Clarke including "Things Are Gonna Get Worse", "Evidently Chickentown", "Twat" and "Beasley Street".

Critical reception
John Crace, writing for The Guardian, described the documentary as "a film that dealt in myths rather than reality" but assessed Clarke as "still clever, funny and relevant." Mark Monahan in The Daily Telegraph wrote that the programme "veered too close to comfort towards hagiography" but "was nevertheless perhaps a fair reflection of the affection with which [Clarke] has been widely regarded."

References

External links
 Official webpage

BBC television documentaries
2012 in British television
Documentary films about punk music and musicians
Documentary films about poets
2012 documentary films
2012 films
2010s British films